The East Brookfield River is a  river in Massachusetts that heads at Lake Lashaway in East Brookfield at an elevation of  above sea level.

History
This river receives its name from East Brookfield, Massachusetts. Via the Quaboag River, it is part of the Chicopee River Watershed.

Watershed
This river starts at the Lake Lashaway Dam, near State Route 9 and continues through wetlands to Quaboag Pond. Numerous local brooks and streams from the towns of East Brookfield, North Brookfield, and Spencer drain the watershed into Lake Lashaway and the East Brookfield River. About one mile from its mouth at Quaboag Pond, the Seven Mile River joins, draining water from Spencer and surrounding areas.

Coordinates
 Head at Lake Lashaway Dam
 Mouth at Quaboag Pond

See also
List of rivers of Massachusetts

References

Rivers of Worcester County, Massachusetts
Tributaries of the Connecticut River
Rivers of Massachusetts